Wood is a magazine catering to the home and hobby woodworker with more than 350,000 subscribers. It publishes seven regular issues annually (December/January, March, May, July, September, October, and November). It has the highest circulation of any woodworking magazine in the world.

History and profile
Wood was founded in 1984 on the principle of the Better Homes and Gardens Test Kitchen, where no recipe goes into the magazine before it's tested. For woodworkers, that means that every project in the magazine has been built in Wood'''s own woodworking shop; every woodworking technique published has been tried and accomplished by the editors; and every tool or product that appears in the pages of the magazine has been shop-tested and its performance evaluated.

There have only been three editors-in-chief in Wood'''s history. Founder Larry Clayton retired in 2000 (after issue 132, April 2001), his successor Bill Krier retired in April 2012, after which Dave Campbell took over at the helm. Its editorial and advertising offices are in Des Moines, Iowa.

References

External links
 

Lifestyle magazines published in the United States
Hobby magazines published in the United States
Magazines established in 1984
Magazines published in Iowa
Mass media in Des Moines, Iowa
Meredith Corporation magazines
Woodworking magazines
1984 establishments in Iowa
Arts and crafts magazines
IAC (company)